Round the Outside! Round the Outside! is a studio album by English impresario Malcolm McLaren and American hip hop group the World's Famous Supreme Team. It was released in 1990 through Virgin Records.

Sections of the track Operaa House! (the opera singing portions) as well as parts of the accompanying music video were repurposed into a track named "Aria on Air" which was then used in British Airways television commercials in the early 1990s.

Track listing

Charts

References

External links

1990 albums
Malcolm McLaren albums
Virgin Records albums
Eurodance albums
Hip hop albums by English artists
Pop-rap albums